Kambozia or Kambuzia is an Iranian masculine given name. Notable people with the name include:

Kambozia Jamali (1938–2010), Iranian football midfielder
Kambuzia Partovi (1955–2020), Iranian film director and scriptwriter

Iranian masculine given names